The Grand Prix de Monaco was a single-day road cycling race held annually in Monaco from 1949 to 1983.

Winners

References

Cycle racing in Monaco
Classic cycle races
Recurring sporting events established in 1949
Recurring sporting events disestablished in 1983
Defunct cycling races